Bootlegger is a Canadian drama film, directed by Caroline Monnet and released in September 2021. The film centres on Mani (Kawennáhere Devery Jacobs), an indigenous graduate student in university who returns to her reserve in Quebec to advocate for a community referendum banning the sale of alcohol, placing her at odds with Laura (Pascale Bussières), a bootlegger who profits from the sale of alcohol in the community.

The cast also includes Brigitte Poupart, Jacob Whiteduck-Lavoie, Joshua Odjick, Jacques Newashish, Dominique Pétin and Samian.

The film was shot in fall 2019 in Kitigan Zibi, Quebec. Prior to its production, the film's screenplay won the Cinéfondation bursary for Best Screenplay at the 2017 Cannes Film Festival.

The film premiered at the 2021 Cinéfest Sudbury International Film Festival, and screened as the opening film of the 2021 Festival du nouveau cinéma, in advance of its commercial premiere on October 15.

Monnet was named the winner of the juried award for Emerging Canadian Director at the 2021 Vancouver International Film Festival. The film was a nominee for the DGC Discovery Award at the 2021 Directors Guild of Canada awards.

References

External links

2021 films
Canadian drama films
Films shot in Quebec
Films set in Quebec
Films directed by Caroline Monnet
2020s Canadian films